Klaus Thomsen (born 26 April 1986) is a Danish handball player for Bjerringbro-Silkeborg and the Danish national team.

Career 
Klaus Thomsen's first stations as a handball player were Næssets IF and Team Haderslev. 
In the summer of 2004, he joined the backcourt Viborg HK on. He was initially injured again, after which he joined the second division side Lemvig-Thyborøn Håndbold. In 2009, Lemvig rose to the highest Danish league. After Lemvig 2012 had to go to the gear in the second division, changed the defense specialist to Team Tvis Holstebro. With Team Tvis Holstebro he was in the final four of the EHF Europa Cup 2012/13. In addition to his playing career, he worked as a coach of a youth team of Tvis KFUM and at the Elitesport Academy in Holstebro. Since the season 2014/15 he is at Bjerringbro-Silkeborg under contract. With Bjerringbro-Silkeborg he won the 2016 championship. Klaus Thomsen made his debut on April 5, 2013 in the Danish national team. Previously, he already ran for the B national team. At the European Championship 2014 in his own country, he was Vice-European champion.

Honours
Danish Championship:
: 2016

References

1986 births
Living people
Danish male handball players